Torku Şekerspor was a Turkish professional cycling team, based in Konya, Central Anatolia.They folded after the 2018 season. The team was sponsored by the local sugar and chocolate industries. It is part of the Konya Anadolu Selçukspor organisation, a Turkish TFF Second League football team.

In 2011, the team became Turkey's first ever professional bicycle racing team. It has UCI Continental team status.

Team member Miraç Kal qualified for participation in the road race event at the 2012 Summer Olympics.

Team member Ahmet Örken qualified for participation in the time trial event at the 2016 Summer Olympics.

Doping
In April 2012 Ivailo Gabrovski tested positive for Erythropoietin (EPO) on Stage 3 of the 2012 Tour of Turkey, winning the stage and the overall title. Gabrovski was banned for two years and had his victory stripped. In May 2012 Volodymyr Bileka tested positive for Norpseudoephedrine on Stage 1 of the 2012 Tour of Trakya receiving a four-year suspension for his second doping offence.

In March 2013, Mustafa Sayar tested positive for EPO after Stage 1 of the 2013 Tour d'Algérie.

Final roster

Major wins

2010
Overall, Romania Tour of Szeklerland, Evgeniy Gerganov
Stage 7 Tour of Bulgaria, Evgeniy Gerganov
Overall The Paths of King Nikola, Vladimir Koev
Stage 1, Vladimir Koev

2011
Stage 5 Tour du Maroc, Eyüp Karagöbek
Stage 4 Tour of Trakya, Muhammet Atalay
Overall Tour of Isparta, Mustafa Sayar
Stage 1, Mustafa Sayar
Stage 3, Danail Petrov
Stage 5 Tour of Romania, Vladimir Koev
Stage 3 Tour of Cappadocia, Miraç Kal
Overall Sibiu Cycling Tour, Vladimir Koev
Stage 3, Vladimir Koev
Stage 4 Tour of Marmara, Eyüp Karagöbek
Stage 4 Tour of Alanya, Hüseyin Özcan

2012
Stage 4 Azerbaijan Tour, Yuriy Metlushenko
Overall Tour of Trakya, Yuriy Metlushenko
Stages 1, 2 & 4, Yuriy Metlushenko
Stage 3 Baltic Chain Tour, Yuriy Metlushenko
Stage 4 Tour of Taihu Lake, Yuriy Metlushenko

2013
Stage 2 Tour d'Algérie, Sergiy Grechyn
Stage 1 Tour de Blida, Mustafa Sayar
Stage 6 Tour du Maroc, Ahmet Örken
Overall Tour d'Azerbaïdjan, Sergiy Grechyn
Stage 2, Sergiy Grechyn
Stages 4 & 6 Tour de Serbie, Ahmet Örken
Stage 2 Tour of Qinghai Lake, David de la Fuente
Overall Tour of Taihu Lake, Yuriy Metlushenko
Stages 1, 2, 3, 4 & 9, Yuriy Metlushenko

2014
Stage 9 Tour of Qinghai Lake, Ahmet Örken

2015
Overall Tour of Çanakkale, Ahmet Akdilek
Prologue, Ahmet Akdilek
Stage 3, İsmail Akşoy
Overall Tour du Maroc, Tomasz Marczyński
Stages 1, 4 & 7, Tomasz Marczyński
Stage 2, Ahmet Örken
Overall Tour of Black Sea, Tomasz Marczyński
Stage 1, Tomasz Marczyński
Stage 3, Ahmet Örken
Stage 3 Tour of Iran, İsmail Akşoy
Overall Tour of Ankara, Nazim Bakırcı
Stage 1, Nazim Bakırcı
Stage 4, Feritcan Şamlı
Overall International Tour of Torku Mevlana, Ahmet Örken
Prologue, Stages 2 & 3, Ahmet Örken
Overall Tour of Aegean, Ahmet Örken
Prologue & Stage 1, Ahmet Örken
Stage 3, Rasim Reis

2016
Overall Tour of Mersin, Nazim Bakırcı
Stage 1 Tour of Ankara, Feritcan Şamlı
Stage 2 Tour of Ankara, Mustafa Sayar
Stage 3 Tour of Ankara, Fatih Keleş

2017
Les Challenges de la Marche Verte GP Oued Eddahab, Ivan Balykin
Les Challenges de la Marche Verte GP Al Massira, Ahmet Örken
Stage 2 Tour of Ankara, Ivan Balykin
Stage 2b (ITT) Tour of Bihor, Ivan Balykin
Stage 2 Tour de Serbie, Luca Chirico
Stage 3 Tour de Serbie, Ahmet Örken
Stages 4 & 10 Tour of Qinghai Lake, Ahmet Örken

2018
Overall Tour of Mediterrennean, Onur Balkan
Stages 2 & 3, Onur Balkan
Overall Tour of Cartier, Cristian Raileanu
Stage 2, Cristian Raileanu
Stage 2 Tour of Fatih Sultan Mehmet, Batuhan Ozgur
Overall Tour of Mesopotamia, Nazim Bakırcı
Stage 1, Ivan Balykin
Stage 2, Nazim Bakırcı
Stage 4, Onur Balkan
Overall Tour of Mevlana, Ivan Balykin
Stage 2, Ivan Balykin
Stage 9 Tour of Qinghai Lake, Onur Balkan
Stage 3 Tour of Cappadocia, Onur Balkan
Stage 5 Tour of Romania, Onur Balkan
Stage 3 Tour of Black Sea, Batuhan Ozgur

National champions

2009
 Turkey Road Race, Miraç Kal

2011
 Bulgaria Road Race, Danail Petrov

2012
 Turkey Road Race, Miraç Kal
 Turkey Under-23 Time Trial, Feritcan Şamlı

2013
 Turkey Road Race, Nazim Bakırcı
 Turkey Time Trial, Bekir Baki Akırşan
 Kazakhstan Time Trial, Andrey Mizurov

2014
 Turkey Road Race, Feritcan Şamlı
 Turkey Time Trial, Ahmet Örken
 Turkey Under-23 Time Trial, Alihan Demirbağ

2015
 Turkey Road Race, Ahmet Akdilek
 Turkey Time Trial, Ahmet Örken
 Poland Road Race, Tomasz Marczyński
 Turkey Under-23 Road Race, Batuhan Özgür
 Turkey Under-23 Time Trial, Halil İbrahim Dilek

2016
 Turkey Time Trial, Ahmet Örken

2018
 Turkey Road Race, Onur Balkan

References

External links
 

UCI Continental Teams (Europe)
Cycling teams based in Turkey
Cycling teams established in 1955
Sport in Konya
1955 establishments in Turkey
Defunct cycling teams based in Turkey